AnnoZero was an Italian television talk show hosted by the Italian journalist Michele Santoro and was broadcast on Rai 2 from  2006 to 2011. Beatrice Borromeo was a collaborator on this show from 2006–2008. Journalist Marco Travaglio was a permanent guest on the show, which officially ended its run on 9 June 2011 with a last episode being shown on 28 June of that year.

Seasons

First season
Featuring Michele Santoro, Marco Travaglio, Vauro Senesi, Sandro Ruotolo, Beatrice Borromeo, and Rula Jebreal.

14-09-2006 – "Milano e l'immigrazione"
21-09-2006 – "O' sistema"
12-10-2006 – "Bologna: il lavoro e i precari"
19-10-2006 – "La Calabria e la 'Ndrangheta"
26-10-2006 – "Vicenza: piove governo ladro"
09-11-2006 – "Padova: figli del Dio maggiore"
16-11-2006 – "Palermo: meglio dentro che fuori"
23-11-2006 – "Napoli: delitto e perdono"
07-12-2006 – "Roma: guerrieri della libertà"

Second season
Featuring Michele Santoro, Marco Travaglio, Vauro Senesi, Sandro Ruotolo, and Beatrice Borromeo.

08-03-2007 – "Orgoglio e pregiudizio"
15-03-2007 – "Vicenza, casalinghe alla riscossa"
29-03-2007 – "Amore mio"
05-04-2007 – "Chi decide per me?"
12-04-2007 – "E io pago!"
19-04-2007 – "Vado al minimo"
26-04-2007 – "Patrioti"
03-05-2007 – "Baroni si nasce"
10-05-2007 – "Dio salvi la famiglia!"
17-05-2007 – "La casa è un sogno"
24-05-2007 – "Troppo buoni?!"
31-05-2007 – "Non commettere atti impuri"
14-06-2007 – "Cavalli di razza"
21-06-2007 – "Dimenticare il futuro"

Third season
Featuring Michele Santoro, Marco Travaglio, Vauro Senesi, Sandro Ruotolo, and Beatrice Borromeo.

20-09-2007 – "Tsunami"
27-09-2007 – "Va' da' via el cu"
04-10-2007 – "A ciascuno il suo"
11-10-2007 – "Ordine!"
18-10-2007 – "I Perdenti"
25-10-2007 – "A viso aperto"
01-11-2007 – "Profondo Rosso"
08-11-2007 – "Il partigiano Biagi"
15-11-2007 – "Attenti ai nostri"
22-11-2007 – "Ieri, oggi. E domani?"
29-11-2007 – "Che casino?"
06-12-2007 – "Libera o occupata"
13-12-2007 – "Un Paese senza"
20-12-2007 – "I buoni e i cattivi"
24-01-2008 – "Chi di Mastella ferisce..."
31-01-2008 – "Questioni d'onore"
07-02-2008 – "Ancora tu"
14-02-2008 – "San Valentino da soli"
21-02-2008 – "Tutta colpa dei Verdi"
28-02-2008 – "Liste pulite"
06-03-2008 – "Basta un poco di zucchero?"
13-03-2008 – "Sprechi con le ali"
20-03-2008 – "Nel nome della Madre"
27-03-2008 – "Io voto casa"
31-03-2008 – "Un Paese in bilico"
17-04-2008 – "Una storia italiana"
24-04-2008 – "Ritorno a Gomorra"
01-05-2008 – "O bella ciao"
08-05-2008 – "La peggio gioventù"
15-05-2008 – "Se li conosci, li eviti?"
22-05-2008 – "Un presidente spazzino"
30-05-2008 – "Il divo e noi"
05-06-2008 – "Prove d'orchestra"

Fourth season
Featuring Michele Santoro, Marco Travaglio, Vauro Senesi, Sandro Ruotolo, Corrado Formigli, and Margherita Granbassi.

25-09-2008 – "Il ritorno dei ‘Cai’mani""
02-10-2008 – "Italiani ‘brutta’ gente"
09-10-2008 – "I soldi sono nulla"
16-10-2008 – "Chi perde paga"
23-10-2008 – "Le mani sul futuro"
30-10-2008 – "Io non ho paura"
06-11-2008 – "Domani"
13-11-2008 – "Fannullone a chi?"
20-11-2008 – "Il futuro che mi merito"
27-11-2008 – "Pane e ottimismo"
04-12-2008 – "L'isola di Obama"
11-12-2008 – "Aiuto, la crisi!"
18-12-2008 – "Questione morale"
15-01-2009 – "La guerra dei bambini"
22-01-2009 – "Giulietta chi è?"
29-01-2009 – "Io non ti salverò"
05-02-2009 – "Il silenzio degli innocenti"
12-02-2009 – "Eluana e Napoleone"
26-02-2009 – "Quando finirà?"
05-03-2009 – "Arrivano i mostri"
12-03-2009 – "Il partito che non c'è"
19-03-2009 – "Il rosso e il nero"
26-03-2009 – "Tutti a casa!"
02-04-2009 – "Lacrime e rabbia"
09-04-2009 – "Resurrezione"
16-04-2009 – "Caccia all'abusivo"
23-04-2009 – "Il Paese dei manganelli"
30-04-2009 – "È passata la bufera?"
07-05-2009 – "Il complotto"
15-05-2009 – "Mi gioco la Fiat"
21-05-2009 – "Lasciamolo lavorare?"
25-05-2009 – "I soldi son desideri"
04-06-2009 – "Corri bisonte corri"
11-06-2009 – "C'era una volta Enrico"

Fifth season
Featuring Michele Santoro, Marco Travaglio, Vauro Senesi, Sandro Ruotolo, Corrado Formigli, and Giulia Innocenzi.

External links
 Profile page on IMDb
 Official fan page on Facebook

Current affairs shows
Italian television talk shows
2006 Italian television series debuts
2011 Italian television series endings
RAI original programming
2000s Italian television series
2010s Italian television series